The Miss Universo Paraguay 2016 pageant was held at AwA Resort on October 1, 2016, to select Paraguayan representatives to 3 major beauty pageants: Miss Universe, Miss International and Miss Supranational. It was broadcast live on SNT. 
For the first time in the history of this pageant, the event was held in Encarnación City, 365 km away from the Paraguayan capital.

Results

Special awards

Delegates
There are 15 official contestants.

Contestants notes
 Some of the candidates participated, or will participate, in other important contests:
 Andrea Melgarejo (Guairá) have represented her country at Miss Earth 2015 held in Vienna, Austria.
 Tatiana Rolin (Itapúa) participated in Face of Beauty International 2014, held in the Taiwanese city of Taichung, where she finished in the Top 10 position.
 Blanca Amarilla (Misiones) represents Paraguay in Miss Atlántico Internacional 2013, the next year she won the title of Miss Verano 2014 in her country.

See also
Miss Paraguay
Miss Universe 2016
Miss International 2016

External links
Promociones Gloria, holder of the franchises.
Reinas de Belleza del Paraguay Facebook Page

References

2016
2016 beauty pageants
2016 in Paraguay
October 2016 events in South America